Xylecata uniformis is a moth of the  subfamily Arctiinae. It is found in Ivory Coast.

References

Nyctemerina
Moths described in 1880